Antonella Interlenghi (born 6 August 1960) is an Italian stage, film and television actress. She is also known as 
Antonellina Interlenghi.

Life and career 
Born in Rome, Interlenghi is the daughter of the actors Antonella Lualdi and Franco Interlenghi. 

She made her acting debut (credited as Phoenix Grant) in the 1977 Gianfranco Parolini adventure film Yeti: The 20th Century Giant. In the 1980s she appeared in a number of films, mainly comedy and adventure films. She is also active on stage, where she notably worked with Giorgio Strehler, and on television.

Personal life 
At 15 years old, Interlenghi married the nobleman Giovanni Sanjust di Teulada. The couple had two daughters and divorced two years after the marriage.

Selected filmography   
 Yeti: The 20th Century Giant (1977) (credited as Phoenix Grant)
 City of the Living Dead (1981)
 "Un Centesimo di Secondo" (1981)
 Vacanze di Natale (1983)
 Vacanze in America (1984)
 La Cage aux Folles 3: The Wedding (1985)
 Sottozero (1987)
 Mother (1990)
 Ho sposato un calciatore (2005)

References

External links 
 

 

Actresses from Rome
Italian stage actresses
Italian film actresses
Italian television actresses
1961 births 
20th-century Italian actresses 
Living people
Italian people of Greek descent